The 1995 Little League World Series took place between August 21 and August 26 in Williamsport, Pennsylvania. The Shan-Hua Little League of Tainan, Taiwan, defeated the Northwest 45 Little League of Spring, Texas, in the championship game of the 49th Little League World Series.

Teams

Pool play

Elimination round

Notable players
Jeff Frazier (Toms River, New Jersey) - Former MLB player

External links
1995 Tournament Bracket via Wayback Machine

Little League World Series
Little League World Series
Little League World Series
Little League World Series